αr35 is a family of bacterial small non-coding RNAs with representatives in a reduced group of Alphaproteobacteria from the order Hyphomicrobiales. The first member of this family (Smr35B) was found in a Sinorhizobium meliloti 1021 locus located in the symbiotic plasmid B (pSymB). Further homology and structure conservation analysis have identified full-length SmrB35 homologs in other legume symbionts (i.e. Rhizobium leguminosarum bv.viciae, R. leguminosarum bv. trifolii and R. etli), as well as in the human and plant pathogens Brucella anthropi and Agrobacterium tumefaciens, respectively. αr35 RNA species are 139-142 nt long (Table 1) and share a common secondary structure consisting of two stem loops and a well conserved rho independent terminator (Figure 1, 2, 3). Most of the αr35 transcripts can be catalogued as trans-acting sRNAs expressed from well-defined promoter regions of independent transcription units within intergenic regions of the Alphaproteobacterial genomes (Figure 5).

Discovery and Structure 

Smr35B sRNA was firstly described by del Val et al., as a result of a computational comparative genomic approach in the intergenic regions (IGRs) of the reference S. meliloti 1021 strain. Northern hybridization experiments confirmed that the predicted smr35B locus did express a single transcript of the expected size, which accumulated differentially in free-living and endosymbiotic bacteria. TAP-based 5’-RACE experiments mapped the transcription start site (TSS) of the full-length Smr35B transcript to the 577,730 nt position in the S. meliloti 1021 genome (http://iant.toulouse.inra.fr/bacteria/annotation/cgi/rhime.cgi) whereas the 3’-end was assumed to be located at the 577,868 nt position matching the last residue of the consecutive stretch of Us of a bona fide Rho-independent terminator (Figure 5). Recent deep sequencing-based characterization of the small RNA fraction (50-350 nt) of S. meliloti further confirmed the expression of Smr35B (here referred to as SmelB053), and mapped the 5’- and 3´-ends of the molecule to the positions proposed earlier.

The nucleotide sequence of Smr35B was initially used as query to search against the Rfam database. This homology search rendered no matches to known bacterial sRNA in this database. Smr35B was next BLASTed with default parameters against all the currently available bacterial genomes (1,615 sequences at 20 April 2011; https://www.ncbi.nlm.nih.gov;). The regions exhibiting significant homology to the query sequence (78-89% similarity) were extracted to create a Covariance Model (CM) from a seed alignment using Infernal (version1.0) (Figure 2).

This CM was used in a further search for new members of the αr35 family in the existing bacterial genomic databases.

The results were manually inspected to deduce a consensus secondary structure for the family (Figure 1 and Figure 2). The consensus structure was also independently predicted with the program locARNATE with very similar predictions. The manual inspection of the 84 sequences found with the CM using Infernal allowed finding seven true homolog sequences: two copies in Rhizobium leguminosarum bv. viciae (chromosome and plasmid pRL11), two copies in Rhizobium leguminosarumbv. trifolii WSM1325 (plasmid pR132504 and plasmid pR132502), in Rhizobium etli CFN 42 plasmid p42f and in the chromosomes of Agrobacterium tumefaciens and Brucella anthropi. All these sequences showed significant Infernal E-values (1.38e-33 – 1.05e-11) and bit-scores. In the case of S. meliloti a second copy was identified in the symbiotic plasmid pSymB (574630-574766) with a significant E-value (3.73e-07) but no expression has been detected under any of the tested conditions (unpublished data). The rest of the sequences found with the model showed high E-values between (8.76e-12 and 1.e-3) but very low bit-scores, which usually is a sign of a remote homologue. However, a manual inspection of these cases showed that the rho independent terminator and the second stem were the only conserved regions, failing the first stem. This two stem arregment construction was largely extended in all the Alphaproteobacteria, being specially conserved in Brucella species.

Expression information 

Smr35B expression was first assessed by del Val et al. in S. meliloti 1021 under different biological conditions; i.e. bacterial growth in TY, minimal medium (MM) and luteolin-MM broth and endosymbiotic bacteria (i.e. mature symbiotic alfalfa nodules). Expression of Smr35B in free-living bacteria was found to be growth-dependent, being the gene down-regulated when bacteria entered the stationary phase. Supplementation of MM with luteolin, the plant flavone that specifically induces transcription of the S. meliloti nodulation genes, stimulated the expression of Smr35B by ~4 fold. In contrast, the Smr35B transcript was not detected in mature nodule tissues. Schlüter et al. further described up-regulation of Smr35B upon an osmotic upshift.

Promoter Analysis 

All αr35 loci have recognizable σ70-dependent promoters showing a -35/-10 consensus motif CTTAGAC-n17-CTATAT previously shown to be widely conserved among several other genera in the Alphaproteobacteria. To identify binding sites for other known transcription factors we used the fasta sequences provided by RegPredict(http://regpredict.lbl.gov/regpredict/help.html), and used those position weight matrices (PSWM) provided by RegulonDB (http://regulondb.ccg.unam.mx). We built PSWM for each transcription factor from the RegPredict sequences using the Consensus/Patser program, choosing the best final matrix for motif lengths between 14 and 30  if the corresponding length had not been previously specified (see "Consensus matrices" threshold (average E-value < 10E-10) for each matrix was established (see "Thresholded consensus" in http://gps-tools2.its.yale.edu). Moreover, we searched for conserved unknown motifs using MEME (http://meme.sdsc.edu/meme4_6_1/intro.html) and used relaxed regular expressions (i.e. pattern matching) over all Smr35B homologs promoters. Only an inverted repeat structure built around the motif T-N11-A was found 55 nt upstream of the transcription start site of SmrB35 in S. meliloti which is a degenerated motif of the known conserved nod boxes (Figure 4). This characteristic sequence has been proposed as the specific binding site for the LysR-type proteins. All promoter regions of the seed SmrB35 homologs presented the motif as well.

Genomic Context 

Most of the members of the αr35 family are trans-encoded sRNAs transcribed from independent promoters in the IGRs of the rhizobial megaplasmids. Exceptions are SmrB35 homologs of R. leguminosarum bv. viciae (Rlvr35C),and R. etli CFN 42 plasmid p42f (ReCFNr35f), which are encoded in the opposite strand of annotated genes, partially overlapping ORFs. The predicted protein products of these overlapping ORFs could not be assigned to any functional category on the basis of the amino acid sequence homology. Thus, these αr35 members are putative cis-encoded antisense sRNAs.
The genomic regions of the trans-encoded αr35 sRNAs exhibit partial conservation mainly limited to the sRNA-coding sequence and one flanking gene. Most of the flanking genes of the αr35 loci encode transcription factors and proteins related to nitrogen and glutamine metabolism.

References 

RNA